Ralf Zerback (born 1961) is a German historian and author.

Ralf Zerback was born in Stuttgart. He studied history in Frankfurt and Heidelberg. He was a pupil of the historian Lothar Gall. He got a doctorate with a thesis about the bourgeoisie of Munich in the 19th century. Also he worked in different research projects. He now works as a journalist and author in Frankfurt.

Books 
Reformpläne und Repressionspolitik 1830-1834, 2003, 
Robert Blum, Lehmstedt Verlag, Leipzig, 2007, 

German non-fiction writers
1961 births
Living people
German male non-fiction writers